Silvo Breskvar (December 31, 1902 – January 3, 1969 in  Ljubljana) was a Yugoslav mathematician and physicist.

References

Yugoslav mathematicians
Yugoslav physicists
1902 births
1969 deaths
Scientists from Ljubljana